The archipelago of Gothenburg comprises northern and southern archipelagoes. The southern archipelago is part of Gothenburg municipality located in the province of Västergötland while the northern archipelago is Öckerö municipality, located in the province of Bohuslän.

Trafikverket has ferries from Lilla Varholmen to the northern archipelago. Some of the islands are interconnected by bridges. Southern archipelago ferries go from Saltholmen, plus a freight ferry from Fiskebäck.

Northern archipelago

The main islands of the northern Gothenburg archipelago are:
Björkö
Fotö
Grötö
Hyppeln
Hälsö
Hönö
Kalvsund
Källö-Knippla
Rörö
Öckerö

Southern archipelago

The southern Gothenburg archipelago lies off the coast of Gothenburg, Sweden's second-largest city. It has 5,000 permanent and another 6,000 summer residents. The archipelago is completely car free. Transportations is carried out by means of cycles, delivery mopeds, electric cars and ferries.

In the Norse sagas, it was called Elfarsker (the river islets), as the river Göta älv had its estuary there. The islands appear to have been famous as a location for holmgangar during the Viking Age.

Sagas where the location appears:
Örvar-Odds saga
Bósa saga ok Herrauðs
Þorsteins saga Víkingssonar
One of the islands, Brännö, is described as an important location for fairs in the Laxdæla saga, and it is also considered to be the likely location of Breca and the Brondings of the Anglo-Saxon poems Widsith and Beowulf.
Köpstadsö is often called Kössö. It is a small island with narrow footpaths. Not even mopeds are allowed here. The name of the island implies trading.
Styrsö: during the 1830s the Öberg family established a guesthouse there. This was the start of a bathing resort, which expanded rapidly with the start of steamboats in 1867.
Donsö is an important fishing and ship-owning community. The harbour is the center of the island. It is surrounded by 20th century fishing facilities.
Vargö has been a nature reserve since 1986. The varied sea landscape offers a diversity of flora. It is a good place to see razorbills, woodland birds, gulls and eiders.
Vrångö is the southernmost inhabited island with a small town centre and a hiking route round both the north and south of the island.

See also 
Rivö fjord, the estuary of the Göta älv

References

External links 

Southern Gothenburg Archipelago 
The Gothenburg Archipelago Göteborg & Co

 
Car-free zones in Europe
Archipelago
Landforms of Västra Götaland County
Archipelagoes of the North Sea
Islands on the Swedish West Coast